Sharon L. Nordgren (born October 21, 1943) is a Democratic member of the New Hampshire House of Representatives, representing the Grafton 12th District since 1988.

External links
New Hampshire House of Representatives - Sharon Nordgren official NH House website
Project Vote Smart - Representative Sharon L. Nordgren (NH) profile
Follow the Money - Sharon Nordgren
2006 2004 2002 1998 campaign contributions

Democratic Party members of the New Hampshire House of Representatives
1943 births
Living people
Politicians from Chicago
People from Hanover, New Hampshire
University of Minnesota alumni
Women state legislators in New Hampshire
20th-century American politicians
20th-century American women politicians
21st-century American politicians
21st-century American women politicians